Junction View is a rural locality in the Lockyer Valley Region, Queensland, Australia.

History 
In 1922, the school buildings were moved to the Junction, ready for re-opening as Junction View State School from 18 August 1922. The Black Duck State School site was sold by the Queensland Government in 1985. Junction View State State School was mothballed on 31 December 2008 and closed on 31 December 2010. It was at 7 East Haldon Road. The school's website was archived.

Education 
There are no schools in Junction View. The nearest government primary school is Mount Sylvia State School in Mount Sylvia to the north-east. The nearest government secondary schools are Lockyer District State High School in Gatton to the north-east and Clifton State High School in Clifton to the south-west.

Amenities 
Junction View Community Hall is at 275 Mount Sylvia Road.

References 

Lockyer Valley Region
Localities in Queensland